Nicolas Aubriot (born 27 September 1984 in Saint-Pol-sur-Ternoise) is a French professional football player. Currently, he plays in the Championnat National for AS Cherbourg Football.

He played on the professional level in Ligue 2 for FC Gueugnon.

References

1984 births
Living people
French footballers
Ligue 2 players
FC Gueugnon players
AS Cherbourg Football players
Association football defenders